The Rolleiflex SL35 is a range of SLR cameras from the German camera maker, Rollei. This range of camera uses 35mm film. The camera bodies were initially made in Germany,  and later, Singapore. Rolleiflex SL35 uses QBM (Quick Bayonet Mount) mount, with a focal flange distance of 44.5 mm.

History

The Rolleiflex SL35 was the first 35mm SLR produced by Rollei, in 1970. The SL35 is in fact a whole range of 35mm SLR cameras, that were developed and built from the 1970s until the 1990s.

The first camera in the range, was the SL35, and compared to its competitors at that time, it was relatively small and light. The Rolleiflex SL35 was the second Rollei SLR camera to be equipped with Carl Zeiss lenses, after the SL66 of 1966.

Four years later, in 1974, Rollei produced the Rolleiflex SL350. The Rolleiflex SL350 had open-aperture metering, an improvement over the Rolleiflex SL35 which was built with a stop down light meter.

In 1976, Rollei produced a new variant, the SL35M. The SL35M was built on a visibly different body based on an earlier Icarex design but with plastic top and baseplates and offered nothing technologically radical.

At the same time, a variant of the SL35M, the SL35ME was also released. Built on the same body, the SL35ME had electronic shutter control inside and could set shutter speeds automatically. The viewfinder also came with a whole range of indicators including aperture and shutter speed amongst others.

Two years later, in 1978, the SL35 E was introduced. It had all the functions of the SL35ME but came in a lighter package. Near-identical bodies (with most components from the same production lines) were sold by Voigtlander as the VSL 3E, and their shared QBM bayonet mount meant that lenses and bodies from both ranges could be used interchangeably.

Lenses

A whole range of lens were made for the SL35 series and the lens were interchangeable between the camera bodies in the series. Most of the lenses were German made Carl Zeiss lenses but apart from the Carl Zeiss lenses, the SL35 range also used the Schneider lens, the Rollei lens and the Rolleinar lens.

Carl Zeiss
 15/3.5 Distagon
 16/2.8 F-Distagon, fisheye
 18/4 Distagon
 25/2.8 Distagon = Color-Skoparex
 28/2 Distagon
 35/1.4 Distagon [triangular aperture]
 35/2.8 Distagon = Color-Skoparex
 50/1.4 Planar
 50/1.8 Planar = Color-Ultron
 60/2.8 Macro-Planar
 85/1.4 Planar [triangular aperture]
 85/2.8 Sonnar = Color-Dynarex
 135/2.8 Sonnar = Color-Dynarex
 135/4 Tele-Tessar = Color-Dynarex
 200/4 Tele-Tessar = Color-Dynarex
 500/4.5 Mirotar, mirror lens
 1000/5.6 Mirotar, mirror lens
 1000/8 Tele-Tessar

Schneider lens
 35/2.8 Angulon
 50/1.8 Xenon
 135/3.5 Tele-Xenar
 35/4 PC-Curtagon, special shift lens
 28/2.8 PC-Super Angulon, special shift lens

Rolleinar
 14/3.5 Fisheye
 21/4
 28/2.8
 35/2.8
 50/2
 50/3.5 Macro
 55/1.4
 85/2.8
 105/2.8
 105/2.8 Macro
 135/2.8
 200/3.5
 400/5.6
 500/8 Reflex, mirror lens
 28-80/3.5-4.5
 28-85/4
 28-105/3.2-4.5
 35-105/3.5
 35-105/3.5-4.3
 50-250/4-5.6
 70-210/3.5-4.5
 80-200/2.8
 80-200/4
 2x converter

Cameras

SL35

Production dates: 1970–1976
Shutter Type: Focal Plane rubber cloth curtain
Shutter Speeds: 1 – 1/1000s, B
Variants:
 Chrome, made in Germany
 Black, made in Germany
 Chrome, made in Singapore
 Black, made in Singapore

SL350

Production dates: 1974–1976
Shutter Type: Focal Plane rubber cloth curtain
Shutter Speeds: 1 – 1/1000s, B
Variants:
 Black, made in Germany
 Chrome, made in Germany

SL35M
Production dates: 1976–1980
Shutter Type: Focal Plane
Shutter Speeds: 1/2- 1/1000s, B
Variants:
 Black, made in Singapore

SL35ME

Production dates: 1976–1980
Shutter Type: Focal Plane rubber cloth curtain
Shutter Speeds: 4 – 1/1000s (auto), 1/30 – 1/1000s (auto), B
Variants:
 Black, made in Singapore

SL35 E

Production dates: 1978–1982
Shutter Type: Focal Plane vertical metal plates
Shutter Speeds: 16 – 1/1000s, B
Variants:
 Black, made in Singapore
 Chrome, made in Singapore

See also 

Rollei
Rolleiflex

References

sl35